Khawaja Wardag (Dera Pathana) is a village in Dera Baba Nanak in Gurdaspur district of Punjab State

Khawaja Wardag is basically an Afghan Muslim village before partition. One of the member from Afghan tribe (Wardag Ismail Khan Kaka with his two sons left village "Shahniz" Ghazni Afghanistan in 1590 and settled in Kakedhir of India and this village given a new name Khawaja Wardag as small village on Batala dera baba nanak Road. Then Ismail Khan Kaka's two sons Sulaman Shah and Feroz Shah settled in other small towns and purchased a fortress or qilla and the given name was Qilla Afghan and than after village came to be known as Kala Afghana. The history of village Khwaja Wardag and village Kala Afghana is directly interlinked with each other.

Demography 
, The village has a total number of 242 houses and the population of 1348 of which 734 are males while 614 are females.  According to the report published by Census India in 2011, out of the total population of the village 24 people are from Schedule Caste and the village does not have any Schedule Tribe population so far.

Sarpanch Ram singh welcomes kabaddi player gurmukh singh he returned from Canada in 2011

Youngsters cleaned the village and planted palm trees in 2019

References

Villages in Gurdaspur district